The 59th Quartermaster Company is a bulk petroleum company designed to provide semi-portable storage for  of fuel and to provide distribution of fuel to military units within a specified geographic area while deployed overseas. Its secondary mission is to provide an armed military escort to military cargo and civilian trucks during overseas contingency operations.  It is a U.S. Army Forces Command combat service support unit stationed at Fort Carson, Colorado under the command of the 68th Combat Sustainment Support Battalion. The 59th has deployed overseas to Algeria, Italy, France, Germany, Korea, Vietnam, Kuwait, Saudi Arabia, Iraq, and Afghanistan.  The 59th is the only bulk petroleum company in the Regular Army; all sister units are part of the Army Reserve as of 2011.

Service history
The unit was constituted into the Regular Army on 13 January 1941 as Company B, 240th Quartermaster Battalion and composed of African-American Soldiers. On 15 February 1944, the unit was redesignated as the 3251st Quartermaster Service Company. During World War II, the unit served in the Mediterranean Theater of Operations and served during the Rome-Arno campaign, the invasion of Southern France (Operation Dragoon); the Rhineland campaign; the Ardennes-Alsace campaign; and the campaign in Central Europe. The unit was inactivated following World War II. It briefly served in Korea from December 1946 until July 1947 when it was redesignated from the 3251st to the 59th. From September 1950 until December 1957 the company served at Fort Lee, Virginia. The 59th deployed to Vietnam in 1965 and served until its inactivation in 1972. The 59th's latest period of service began in 1995 and includes service during Operation Iraqi Freedom and Operation Enduring Freedom.

World War II
 After taking part in both the Louisiana and the Carolina Maneuvers, B Company deployed to Oran, Algeria in November 1942 in support of the Mediterranean Base Section. In June 1944, the 3251st deployed to Italy in support of the 5th Army's Rome/Arno campaign. The 3251st was transferred to the 7th Army and remained under its command for the rest of the war. The 3251st participated in Operation Dragoon in direct support of the 45th Infantry Division under the command of the 240th Quartermaster Battalion and then supported the divisions of the 7th Army as they fought their way across France into Germany. The 3251st returned to the United States through the Newport News Port of Embarcation aboard the AP-116 General Meigs on 13 October 1945.

Vietnam
The 59th served under the 1st Logistics Command while deployed to Vietnam. The company operated the Army mortuaries at Cam Ranh Bay and Boa Loc. In addition, the unit provided clothing reclamation and laundry services on those bases. During their service in Vietnam, the unit strength fluctuated between 297 officers and men and a low of 268 officers and men.

Operation Iraqi Freedom
In 2003 the 59th deployed to Kuwait and various sites in Iraq to support the 3rd Infantry Division. The Fuelmasters deployed again from October 2004 to September 2005 to support the 1st Corps Support Command.

Operation Enduring Freedom
From May to November 2011 the 59th deployed 170 Soldiers to Bagram Airfield, Afghanistan to conduct convoy security operations for logistics convoys. The 59th initially fell under the command of the 17th Combat Sustainment Support Battalion of the 101st Sustainment Brigade and later the 142nd Combat Sustainment Support Battalion of the 10th Sustainment Brigade after the previous units rotated back to the United States.

Current operations
The 59th is currently conducting operations in support of the 4th Infantry Division and its brigade combat teams and other Fort Carson tenant units. In addition, the unit is providing hot (engine running) refuel services at Butts Army Airfield. The airfield provides support to the US Army aviation units based at Fort Carson as well as transient aircraft from other services and bases.

Organization
The 59th Quartermaster Company is organized with a Headquarters platoon, three petroleum supply platoons, and a maintenance platoon. The 40th Quartermaster Detachment normally functions as part of the headquarters platoon.

Personnel
The 59th Quartermaster Company is authorized 225 Soldiers, non-commissioned officers, warrant officers, and officers. The two Soldiers composing the 40th Quartermaster Detachment (Petroleum Laboratory) are attached to the 59th for training, support, and disciplinary purposes.  The 59th is composed of personnel from the Quartermaster Corps, Ordnance Corps, Signal Corps, Adjutant General Corps, Engineer Corp, and Chemical Corps.

Enlisted Specialties
12N Horizontal Construction Engineer
25U Signal Support Specialist
42A Personnel Specialist
74D CBRN Specialist
91B Wheeled Vehicle Mechanic
91C Utilities Equipment Repairer
91D Power Generation Equipment Repairer
91E Allied Trades Specialist
91X Maintenance Supervisor
91Z Senior Maintenance Supervisor
92A Automated Logistical Specialist
92F Petroleum Supply Specialist
92G Food Service Operations
92L Petroleum Laboratory Specialist (40th Quartermaster Detachment only)
92Y Unit Supply Specialist
Warrant Officer Specialties
923A Petroleum Technician
915A Automotive Maintenance Warrant Officer
Officer Specialties
90A Logistics Officer (company commander)
92A Quartermaster, General
92F Petroleum and Water

Equipment
SEE Truck
HMMH Truck
Fuel System Supply Point
Assault Hoseline System
M969 Fuel Tanker
M931 Trucks
M1151
Medium Tactical Vehicles
M998 Humvees
Mine Resistant Ambush Protected Vehicles
Maxxpro MaxxPro Armored Truck
Common Remotely Operated Weapon System
M2 Heavy Machine Gun
MK-19 Automatic grenade Launcher
M249 Light Machine Gun
M16 Rifle
M203 Grenade Launcher
M9 Pistol
Army Combat Uniform
Army Combat Boot
MultiCam
Extended Climate Warfighter Clothing System
Army Combat Shirt
Advanced Combat Helmet
Improved Outer Tactical Vests

Campaign participation credit

Unit decorations

References

External links
Fort Carson Homepage
59th Quartermaster Homepage
US Army Institute of Heraldry page for the 43rd Sustainment Brigade
Official Lineage & Honors for the 59th Quartermaster Company
Army Emergency Relief
Fort Carson homecomings are never routine for soldiers, families
Slideshow of the 2010 Redeployment
The 3251st Quartermaster Company arrives home, page 4, The Saint Petersburg Times
59th trains for deployment
The 52nd Engineer Battalion- previous battalion headquarters for the 59th
Petroleum Doctrine at the Federation of American Scientists website
Vietnam Order of Battle, page 204
The U.S. Army Quartermaster Museum
Memorial Affairs Activities - Republic of Vietnam

059
Quartermaster companies of the United States Army